Clarks Hill is a census-designated place (CDP) in McCormick County, South Carolina, United States. The population was 376 at the 2000 census.

History
The community was named after an 18th-century local blacksmith.

The Hopewell Rosenwald School was listed on the National Register of Historic Places in 2010.

Geography
Clarks Hill is located at  (33.660876, -82.160302).

The soils of Clarks Hill are moderately well drained or well drained. They have brown sandy loam topsoils which are underlain by red clay. This fine-textured material may form a distinct layer or comprise the entire subsoil. They support forests in which loblolly pine and shortleaf pine dominate.

Demographics

As of the census of 2000, there were 376 people, 133 households, and 104 families living in the CDP. The population density was 117.5 people per square mile (45.4/km2). There were 145 housing units at an average density of 45.3/sq mi (17.5/km2). The racial makeup of the CDP was 14.36% White and 85.64% African American. Hispanic or Latino of any race were 0.27% of the population.

There were 133 households, out of which 35.3% had children under the age of 18 living with them, 43.6% were married couples living together, 29.3% had a female householder with no husband present, and 21.8% were non-families. 18.0% of all households were made up of individuals, and 6.0% had someone living alone who was 65 years of age or older. The average household size was 2.83 and the average family size was 3.20.

In the CDP, the population was spread out, with 28.5% under the age of 18, 9.0% from 18 to 24, 30.9% from 25 to 44, 21.5% from 45 to 64, and 10.1% who were 65 years of age or older. The median age was 34 years. For every 100 females, there were 76.5 males. For every 100 females age 18 and over, there were 83.0 males.

The median income for a household in the CDP was $28,269, and the median income for a family was $29,464. Males had a median income of $26,731 versus $22,411 for females. The per capita income for the CDP was $10,305. About 21.1% of families and 16.3% of the population were below the poverty line, including 12.5% of those under age 18 and 50.0% of those age 65 or over.

References

Census-designated places in McCormick County, South Carolina
Census-designated places in South Carolina